Patan may refer to several places in Afghanistan,India and Nepal.

Afghanistan
Patan, Afghanistan

India
Patan district, in the state of Gujarat
 Patan, Gujarat, the main city of the eponymous district
 Patan was the ancient capital of Gujarat state which was known as Ahilwan Patan 
Patan (Lok Sabha constituency), a parliamentary constituency in Gujarat
Patan (Gujarat Vidhan Sabha constituency), an assembly constituency in Gujarat
Patan, Rajasthan, an historical city in Rajputana
Patan, Udaipur, a village in Udaipur district, Rajasthan
Patan, Chhattisgarh, town in Durg district, Chhattisgarh
Patan (Chhattisgarh Vidhan Sabha constituency) state assembly constituency centred around the town
Patan, Maharashtra, a town in Satara district, Maharashtra
Patan (Maharashtra Vidhan Sabha constituency) state assembly constituency centred around the town
Patan, Mawal, a village in Pune district, Maharashtra
Patan, Madhya Pradesh, a town in Jabalpur district, Madhya Pradesh
Patan (Madhya Pradesh Vidhan Sabha constituency) state assembly constituency centred around the town
Patan block, an administrative block of Palamu district, Jharkhand state
Pattan, town in Jammu and Kashmir

Nepal
Patan, Nepal, a city in Lalitpur district (Kathmandu valley)
Patan Durbar Square
Patan, Baitadi, a town in Baitadi district in the far west

See also
 Pattani (disambiguation)
 Pathan (disambiguation)
 Patna (disambiguation)